Bardo Pond are an American psychedelic rock band formed in 1991, and who are currently signed to London-based label Fire Records. The current members are Michael Gibbons (guitar), John Gibbons (guitar), Isobel Sollenberger (flute and vocals), Clint Takeda (bass guitar) and Jason Kourkounis (drums).  Bardo Pond's music is often classified as space rock, acid rock, post-rock, shoegazing, noise or psychedelic rock.  Some Bardo Pond album titles have been derived from the names of esoteric psychedelic substances. Their sound has been likened to Pink Floyd, Spacemen 3 and My Bloody Valentine amongst others.

Allmusic describes Bardo Pond as having "lengthy, deliberate sound explorations filled with all the hallmarks of modern-day space rock: droning guitars, thick distortion, feedback, reverb, and washes of white noise." 
Bardo Pond are a taper-friendly band who encourage fans to make recordings of their shows.

Early years
According to guitarist Michael Gibbons, the band members came together post-university: "...we were basically just out of college, actually, and we just got really interested in free music, and that’s where it started. And we were artists too [a number of the band are visual artists]. So were just started playing free improvised sounds – it was really just kind of that love of making noise and sounds that got us together. Basically we didn’t really learn how to play songs until after about four years, and that’s when things started clicking, and we actually made up songs. But it’s still the same thing”. Joining with guitarist Clint Takeda, they began jamming, and Takeda gave the trio the name Bardo Pond, from the Tibetan Book of the Dead.  At the same time, school chums Sollenberger and Sentz joined the group. The group released the first of several self-distributed cassettes, Shone Like a Ton, in 1992, before releasing Bufo Alvarius on Drunken Fish Records in 1995. Their next record, 1996's Amanita, marked the band's transition to Matador Records and international distribution.

Side projects
The members of Bardo Pond also operate a number of side projects.

500 mg is Michael Gibbons' solo project.

Alasehir is a psychedelic/stoner rock trio featuring Michael Gibbons, John Gibbons and Jason Kourkounis.

Alumbrados produces psychedelic folk/drone music and consists of Michael Gibbons, John Gibbons, Michael Zanghi and Aaron Igler.

Prairie Dog Flesh is more improvisational and rearranges the members of Bardo Pond with Takeda on vocals.

Hash Jar Tempo is a collaboration between Bardo Pond and Roy Montgomery. A pun on Ash Ra Tempel, this project resulted from two "marathon jam/recording sessions" between the two parties and produced two albums: Well Oiled (released in 1997, recorded in 1995) and Under Glass (released in 1999, recorded in 1998).

LSD Pond is a collaboration between Bardo Pond and Japanese psychedelic rock band LSD March. A self-titled album was released in 2008 and contains two discs with live recordings of two nights of jamming.

Moon Phantoms is a collaboration between Bardo Pond and Japanese psychedelic rock band Suishou No Fune. Their self-titled album was released in 2009.

Third Troll features Michael and John Gibbons (guitars), Sollenberger (flute), and includes Kevin Moist (saxophone) and Aaron Igler (synths).

Baikal conducts free form psych experiments. The band consists of John Gibbons, Michael Gibbons, Clint Takeda and Jason Kourkonis. They have released a self-titled album on Important Records.

Vapour Theories is a duo of Michael and John Gibbons. They have released three albums: 'Decant' (self-released), 'Joint Chiefs' (The Lotus Sound), and 'Celestial Scuzz' (Fire Records).

Jason Kourkounis participated as drummer 72 in the Boredoms' 77 Boadrum performance which occurred on July 7, 2007, at the Empire-Fulton Ferry State Park in Brooklyn, New York. He is also currently in Hot Snakes and The Night Marchers, and previously played drums for The Delta 72, The Burning Brides, and Mule (band).

Discography

Studio albums
Bufo Alvarius (1995 - Drunken Fish Records)
Amanita (1996 - Matador Records)
Lapsed (1997 - Matador Records)
Set and Setting (1999 - Matador Records)
Dilate (2001 - Matador Records)
On the Ellipse (2003 - ATP Recordings)
Ticket Crystals (2006 - ATP Recordings)
Bardo Pond (2010 - Fire Records)
Peace On Venus (2013 - Fire Records)
Refulgo (2014 - Three Lobed Recordings)
Under the Pines (2017 - Fire Records)

Collaborative album
Acid Guru Pond (2016 - Fire Records), with Acid Mothers Temple and Guru Guru

Compilations
A Tribute to Spacemen 3 (1998- Rocket Girl)
Everything Is Ending Here: A Tribute To Pavement (2003- Homesleep)  
Batholith (2008 - Three Lobed Recordings)
Peri (2009 - Three Lobed Recordings)
Shone Like A Ton (2014 - Three Lobed Recordings)

EPs
Big Laughing Jym (1995) – (Compulsiv)
Slab 10" (2000 – Three Lobed Recordings)
U.S. Tour, Spring 2001 split with Mogwai (2001 – Matador Records)
Purposeful Availment (2002 – Three Lobed Recordings)
Tigris/Euphrates split 12" with Subarachnoid Space (2002 – Camera Obscura)
 Bog  split 12" with Buck Paco (2005 – Black September Records)
Adrop - Modern Containment EP series (2006 – Three Lobed Recordings)
Yntra (2012) – (Latitudes)
Rise Above It All (2013) – (Fire Records)
Looking For Another Place (2014) – (Fire Records)
Is There a Heaven? (2015) – (Fire Records)

Split album
Parallelogram (2015 - Three Lobed Recordings, with Yo La Tengo)

Volume series
In October 2000, Bardo Pond self-released the first volume in a highly limited series of CD-R jam sessions. The tracks in the Volume series are more improvisational and experimental than the band's studio work.
Vol. 1 (2000 – self released)
Vol. 2 (2001 – self released)
Vol. 3 (2002 – self released)
Vol. 4 (2002 – self released)
Vol. 5 (2004 – self released)
Vol. 6 (2005 – self released)
Selections, Vols. I-IV (2005 – ATP Recordings)
Vol. 7 (2009 – self released)
Vol. 8 (2018 – Fire Records)

References

External links
Bardo Pond Webpage
Bardo Pond page at ATP Recordings
Bardo Pond collection at the Internet Archive's live music archive
Viva Radio's 77 Boadrum Site Profile of Jason Kourkounis (Flash)
Terrascope : interview (2001) (pdf)
Bardo Pond page at Fire Records

American post-rock groups
Musical groups from Pennsylvania
Musical groups from Philadelphia
Neo-psychedelia groups
American psychedelic rock music groups
American space rock musical groups
Musical groups established in 1991
American noise rock music groups
American shoegaze musical groups
Drunken Fish Records artists
1991 establishments in Pennsylvania
Fire Records (UK) artists
ATP Recordings artists